Lorange is a surname. Notable people with the surname include:

David M. Lorange (born 1979), American coastal guard
Peter Lorange (born 1943), Norwegian economist
Pierre Lorange, Canadian politician

See also
 L'Orange (disambiguation)